Solvay is a Belgian multinational chemical company established in 1863, with its headquarters located in Neder-Over-Heembeek, Brussels, Belgium.

In 2015, it realized €12.4 billion in revenues, €2.336 billion of EBITDA, 43% of its sales in emerging high-growth countries, 90% of its sales in markets where it is ranked among the top three manufacturers. With 145 sites, Solvay employs 30,900 people in 53 countries.

History

Founded in 1863 by Ernest Solvay and his brother Alfred Solvay to produce sodium carbonate by the Solvay process, the company has diversified into two main sectors of activity: chemicals and plastics. Before World War I, Solvay was the largest multinational company in the world. It was formerly also active in pharmaceuticals, but agreed to sell that entire division to Abbott Labs for €4.5 billion in September 2009, a deal completed in February 2010.

In April 2011, the firm agreed to the €3.4 billion acquisition of French-based chemicals company Rhodia which was completed in September 2011.

Since January 2012, the new Solvay is listed on the NYSE Euronext in Paris and joined the CAC 40 index in September 2012. Solvay is historically listed on the NYSE Euronext in Brussels and part of BEL20 index.

Following its integration with Rhodia, the Committee of Executive Members at Solvay reorganised its various business units into five segments – Consumer Chemicals, Advanced Materials, Performance Chemicals, Functional Polymers and Corporate & Business Services, effective from 2013.

The company is a supporter of the Solvay Conferences that were started by Ernest Solvay in 1911.

On December 3, 2015, Solvay launched a share issue sent to existing shareholders, completing funding for the $5.5 billion purchase of Cytec Industries Inc.

Corporate affairs

The company's head office is located in Brussels, Belgium. It was previously in Ixelles, Brussels

Solvay's United States subsidiary, Solvay America, Inc., is based in Houston, Texas.

Products
Solvay is a main partner of Solar Impulse and has contributed research and development resources to their solar powered airplane project. That aircraft conducted its first test flight on 3. December 2009, and since then has made solar-powered flights from Switzerland to Spain and Morocco in 2012.

In 2015–2016, Solar Impulse 2 flew around the world, the first such journey by a solar-powered aircraft.

Fuel cell technology
SolviCore, a joint venture by Umicore and Solvay in the field of fuel cells is already pre-marketing membrane-electrode assemblies for different types of fuel cells for portable or mobile use.
	
New generation lithium batteries for hybrid vehicles components make use of Solvay fluorinated polymers in order to reduce carbon dioxide emissions.

Soil remediation
Novosol is a sodium bicarbonate-based process for treating and recovering mineral residues contaminated with heavy metals.

Renewable feedstock
Solvay is working on the development and industrialization of the proprietary Epicerol process for manufacturing epichlorohydrin from natural glycerin.

Legal affairs 
Solvay Specialty Polymers USA, LLC is currently under litigation for its per- and polyfluoroalkyl substances (PFAS) contamination of water sources and soil. PFAS, a group of more than 4,000 compounds used in nonstick cookware, stain-resistant fabrics, firefighting foam and a range of other products, do not break down in the environment, and therefore accumulate in the body. They have been linked to cancer, fertility problems, liver damage, high cholesterol, and other health problems.

In November 2020, the New Jersey Attorney General announced its filing of two lawsuits "to compel the clean-up of contamination and recover Natural Resource Damages (NRDs)", one of which is against Solvay Specialty Polymers USA, LLC and Arkema Inc., alleging they are "two companies responsible for widespread contamination from toxic per- and polyfluoroalkyl substances (PFAS) emanating from a Gloucester County facility, which has contaminated public drinking water in the region." This is part of an ongoing and growing investigation.

Solvay impeded the availability of an analytical standard by legal maneuver.

See also

 Solvac
 List of companies of Belgium

References

External links

Solvay 150 years history

1863 establishments in Belgium
Belgian brands
Pharmaceutical companies of Belgium
Chemical companies of Belgium
Chemical companies established in 1863
Companies listed on Euronext Brussels
Life sciences industry
Manufacturing companies based in Brussels
Multinational companies headquartered in Belgium
Pharmaceutical companies established in 1863
Plastics companies of Belgium